Unexpected Q is a South Korean television entertainment program which airs on MBC every Saturday at 18:25 (KST). The show takes over the time slot of long time variety show Infinite Challenge.

Cast

Hosts
Lee Soo-geun
Jun Hyun-moo

Permanent Cast (starting from episode 3)
Eun Ji-won (Sechs Kies)
Yoo Se-yoon
Seungkwan (Seventeen) (absent in episodes 20-23)

Question Panel
The Koxx (Episodes 1-8; only Lee Hyun-song and Shaun appeared on episodes 1-2)
Duetto (Episode 11)
The East Light (Episodes 9-10, 12-16)

Episodes

2018

Ratings

2018

Awards and nominations

References

Notes

External links
 

2018 South Korean television series debuts
Korean-language television shows
MBC TV original programming
2018 South Korean television series endings